Happy Beach is a Burmese comedy television series. Season 1 aired on Channel 7, from 14 October to 12 December 2013, on Mondays to Fridays at 17:00 for 44 episodes. Season 2 aired on MRTV-4, from November 10, 2014 to January 5, 2015, on Mondays to Fridays at 19:00 for 41 episodes.

Its season 1 aired from October 7 to December 5, 2013 and its season 2 aired from November 3 to December 29, 2014, from Mondays to Fridays at 06:15, on For Comedy Channel, channel from 4TV Network.

Cast
Kyi Zaw Htet as Maung Yin
Kyaw Hsu as Kyaw Hsu
Min Tharke as Tharke
Kyaw Htet as Kyi Aye
Thwin Min Khant as Thwin Min
Wint Yamone Naing as Shwe Katipar
Khay Sett Thwin as Ta Pwint Pann
Mone as Pearl
Thet Oo Ko as Thet Oo
Myat Thu Thu as Zin
Zu Zu Zan as Zu Zu
Kaung Myat San (season 1) (Ep.18) Guest
 Soe Nandar kyaw (season 1) (Ep.18) Guest
May Myint Mo (season 2)
Chue Lay (season 2)
Nat Khat (season 2)

References

External links

Burmese television series
Channel 7 (Myanmar) original programming